Martina Hingis and Flavia Pennetta were the defending champions, but chose not to participate this year. 

Daria Kasatkina and Elena Vesnina won the title, beating Irina-Camelia Begu and Monica Niculescu 6–3, 6–7(7–9) , [10–5] in the final.

Seeds

Draw

References
 Main Draw

2015 Women's Doubles
Kremlin Cup – Doubles